Ibirapuitã Biological Reserve is a state-operated biological reserve in the State of Rio Grande do Sul, Brazil.

History

The reserve was created by decree Nº 31.788 of 27 June 1982.
The reserve lies in the pampas biome.

Status

As of 2009 the State Biological Reserve was a "strict nature reserve" under IUCN protected area category Ia.
The reserve is in the west of the state on the banks of the lbirapuitã River.
It is the only area of full protection to preserve the native grasslands and riparian forest that are home to the black howler (Alouatta caraya).
The area is mostly covered by grass species, with a few espinilho (Vachellia caven) and aroeira-pretas (Myracrodruon urundeuva).
Riparian vegetation includes angico-vermelho (Anadenanthera colubrina ), camboim (Myrciaria delicatula), embira (Daphnopsis) and espinheira-santa (Maytenus ilicifolia).
A new rodent species has been found in the reserve, a tuco-tuco that forms underground galleries.

References

Sources

1982 establishments in Brazil
Biological reserves of Brazil
Protected areas of Rio Grande do Sul
Protected areas established in 1982